Olga is an opera in three-acts and eight scenes in singspiel form composed by Jorge Antunes with a libretto by Gerson Valle. It premiered at Theatro Municipal of São Paulo on October 14, 2006. It is based on the life of Olga Benário Prestes.

Operas
2006 operas
Portuguese-language operas
Operas set in the 20th century
Cultural depictions of German women
Cultural depictions of Brazilian women
Cultural depictions of activists
Operas based on real people